Śródmieście Północne is a neighbourhood, and an area of the Municipal Information System, in the city of Warsaw, Poland, located within the district of Śródmieście.

Administrative boundaries 
Its boundaries are determined by the Jerusalem Avenue to the south, Jana Pawła II Avenue to the west, Solidarności Avenue to the north, and the Warsaw Escarpment of the Vistula river, to the east.

Notes

References 

Srodmiescie Polnocne